Opportunity House is a public alternative high school in Sheridan, Oregon, United States.

Academics
In 2008, 36% of the school's seniors received their high school diploma. Of 44 students, 16 graduated, 18 dropped out, and 10 are still in high school.

References

High schools in Yamhill County, Oregon
Sheridan, Oregon
Alternative schools in Oregon
Public high schools in Oregon